NGC 66  is a barred spiral galaxy discovered by Frank Muller in 1886, and is located in the Cetus constellation.

See also 
 New General Catalogue
 List of NGC objects
 List of galaxies

References

External links 
 

ESO objects
Barred spiral galaxies
Cetus (constellation)
-04-02-002
0066
001236
?